Richard Williams Harold Row (died 16 February 1919) was a philatelist who was one of the "Fathers of Philately" entered on the Roll of Distinguished Philatelists in 1921.

Row was an expert on the stamps of Siam and after his death, his collection was donated to the British Museum by his mother, Mrs Eliza Row. The Row Collection now forms part of the British Library Philatelic Collections. It covers the period 1883 to 1918 in 22 volumes and is mainly of unused material with many blocks, and strong in the various provisional surcharges. It also includes some postal stationery and issues used in Kedah and Kelantan.

References

Year of birth missing
1919 deaths
Alumni of King's College London
Academics of King's College London
Fellows of the Royal Philatelic Society London
British philatelists
Philately of Thailand
Fathers of philately